Norwegian singer-songwriter Aurora has released three studio albums, one compilation album, one soundtrack album, eight extended plays (including five compilation EPs), 48 singles (including nine as a featured artist and eight promotional singles) and 23 music videos.

Aurora released her debut extended play (EP), Running with the Wolves in May 2015 through Decca Records. A song from the EP, "Runaway", became a sleeper hit in 2021 charting in numerous single charts internationally, including the US Billboard Bubbling Under Hot 100 Singles. Later that year, she provided the backing track for the John Lewis Christmas advert, singing a cover of the Oasis song "Half the World Away", which reached number 11 in the UK. In March 2016, Aurora released her debut studio album All My Demons Greeting Me as a Friend, which included previous singles "Runaway", "Running with the Wolves" and "Half the World Away". It charted in various European countries and earned platinum certification two times in Norway. It was preceded by four additional singles: "Murder Song (5, 4, 3, 2, 1)", "Conqueror", "I Went Too Far", and "Winter Bird".

In 2018, she released the EP Infections of a Different Kind (Step 1), which spawned the singles "Queendom" and "Forgotten Love". Aurora's follow-up album, A Different Kind of Human (Step 2), was released in June 2019, and topped the charts in four countries, including the United States. The album was supported by five singles: "Animal", "The Seed", "The River", "Apple Tree", and "Daydreamer". As of July 2021, Aurora has sold over 1 million album-equivalent units worldwide.

Albums

Studio albums

Compilation albums

Soundtrack albums

Extended plays

Compilation extended plays

Singles

As lead artist

As featured artist

Promotional singles

Guest appearances

Songwriting credits
 indicates an un-credited lead vocal contribution.

Music videos

Notes

References

Discography
Discographies of Norwegian artists
Pop music discographies
Folk music discographies